Henri Marquet (19 June 1908 – 14 August 1980, Morlaix) was a French assistant director and screenwriter. He was co-nominated with Jacques Tati for the Academy Award for Best Original Screenplay for the film Mr. Hulot's Holiday (1953).

Filmography

References

External links 

1908 births
1980 deaths
French male screenwriters
French screenwriters
20th-century French male writers
20th-century French screenwriters